Guy Domville Siner (born 16 October 1947) is an American-born English actor best known for his role as Oberleutnant Hubert Gruber in the British television series 'Allo 'Allo! and Dr. Mittenhand in Leprechaun 4: In Space.

Early life
Siner was born in New York City. His father was American, born in Manhattan, New York, and his mother was English, born in Bexhill-on-Sea, Sussex. His mother wanted him to be educated in the United Kingdom, and the family returned there when he was five. After attending St Edmund's School, Hindhead, he trained for the stage at the Webber Douglas Academy of Dramatic Art in London.

He is a cousin of the actress Selina Cadell and her brother, the late Simon Cadell.

Career
Siner's TV credits include Z Cars, Softly, Softly: Taskforce, Doctor Who (Genesis of the Daleks), I, Claudius, Secret Army, You Rang, M'Lord?, 'Allo 'Allo!, The Brittas Empire, Seinfeld, Knots Landing: Back to the Cul-de-Sac, Babylon 5, Martial Law, Diagnosis: Murder, That's My Bush!, Star Trek: Enterprise, ChuckleVision, Family Tree and The Crown. Siner is one of ten actors to appear in both the Star Trek and Doctor Who franchises.

Ironically, one of his early television roles was a 1979 episode of Secret Army of which Allo 'Allo! was a parody.  The episode was entitled "A Safe Place" with Siner appearing as a German Intelligence Officer. 

In 1980, Siner portrayed director Mack Sennett in The Biograph Girl, a short-lived West End musical about the silent film era. 

He was originally set to voice the villain Man Ray in the SpongeBob SquarePants season 2 episode "Mermaid Man and Barnacle Boy III", but was replaced by John Rhys-Davies.

In 2006, Siner appeared in two films by writer/director David Roden, Beginner's Please and The Resurrectionist. From June to July 2007, he reprised his role of Lieutenant Gruber in the stage play of Allo 'Allo!, for Twelfth Night Theatre in Brisbane, alongside Gorden Kaye and Sue Hodge, playing their original roles of René Artois and Mimi Labonq. The other characters were portrayed by various Australian actors, including Katy Manning, Steven Tandy and Jason Gann.

Personal life
After Allo 'Allo! ended in 1992, Siner worked for a time in the United States, based in Los Angeles, California. He has since returned to the United Kingdom, and now resides in Chesham in Buckinghamshire.

Other ventures
Siner voiced several Star Wars video games:

Star Wars: TIE Fighter (1994)
Star Wars: Force Commander (2000)
Star Wars: Galactic Battlegrounds (2001)
Star Wars: Jedi Knight II - Jedi Outcast (2002)

He worked as a script editor on two expanded universe Doctor Who stories in 2008.

Filmography

References

External links

Official website

1947 births
Alumni of the Webber Douglas Academy of Dramatic Art
English male film actors
American people of English descent
English male stage actors
English male television actors
English male voice actors
Living people
Male actors from New York City
People educated at St Edmund's School, Hindhead
People from Chesham
American emigrants to England
20th-century English male actors
21st-century English male actors
British male comedy actors